Gothenburg Squadron (GE) was a naval squadron of the Swedish Navy which has operated in various forms from 1939 to 1951. The unit was based at Gothenburg naval base at Nya Varvet in Gothenburg.

History
The oldest written evidence of a naval station in Gothenburg dates from 1523, when Gustav Vasa based a number of smaller ships at Old Älvsborg Fortress. The Gothenburg Squadron was discontinued in 1959, and its war organization was partly taken over by the Third Squadron (Tredje eskadern). In the peace organization, the newly formed 6th Mine Clearance Department (6. minröjningsavdelningen, 6. mröjA), which was to be placed at the Gullmarn base in Skredsvik, took over the tasks from the Gothenburg Squadron.

World War II
During the fall of 1939, the Gothenburg Squadron consisted of the following ships:
Coastal defence ships: Manligheten
Destroyers:  and 
Submarines: Hajen, Sälen and Valrossen
Minesweepers: Starkodder and Styrbjörn
Gunboats: Skagerack
Patrol boats: 2 x type I and 6 x type II

In September, the squadron was strengthened with the Coastal Fleet's destroyers Klas Horn and Göteborg as well as two submarines.

References

Notes

Print

Further reading

Squadrons of Sweden
Naval units and formations of Sweden
Disbanded units and formations of Sweden
Military units and formations established in 1939
Military units and formations disestablished in 1951